Martin Trnovský (born 7 June 2000) is a Slovak footballer who plays for Slovan Bratislava as a goalkeeper.

Club career

Slovan Bratislava
Trnovský made his Fortuna Liga debut for Slovan Bratislava against Zemplín Michalovce on 4 July 2020. He kept a clean sheet in the match.

Honours
Slovan Bratislava
Fortuna Liga: 2019–20

References

External links
 ŠK Slovan Bratislava official club profile 
 
 
 Futbalnet profile 

2000 births
Living people
Footballers from Bratislava
Slovak footballers
Slovakia youth international footballers
Association football goalkeepers
ŠK Slovan Bratislava players
2. Liga (Slovakia) players
Slovak Super Liga players